Syd Silverman (January 23, 1932 – August 27, 2017) was the owner and publisher of Variety magazine.

Early life
Syd Silverman was born in Manhattan on January 23, 1932, to publisher Sidne Silverman and Vaudeville entertainer Marie (née Saxon) Silverman. He was the grandson of Sime Silverman, who founded Variety. His father was Jewish and his mother was from Kansas. Raised in Harrison, New York, Silverman was educated at the Manlius School and Princeton University, then served for two years in the U.S. Army.

Career
When Silverman's father, Sidne, died in 1950, he became the sole heir to what was then Variety Inc. As he was only 18, a legal guardian oversaw the business until 1956, before he took charge.

After that date Syd managed the company as publisher of both the Weekly Variety in New York and the Daily Variety in Hollywood, until the sale of both papers in 1987 to Cahners Publishing for $64 million.

He remained as publisher until 1990 and became chairman of both publications.

Personal life
Silverman's first wife, Jan McNally Silverman, a Roman Catholic, died in 1997. They had four children, Michael, Mark, Matthew and Marie Silverman Marich. He later married Dr. Joan Hoffman.

Silverman died on 27 August 2017 in Boca Raton, Florida, after a sudden illness.  He was 85.

References

1932 births
2017 deaths
American magazine editors
Variety (magazine) people
American publishing chief executives
Businesspeople from New York City
Manlius Pebble Hill School alumni
Princeton University alumni
United States Army officers
American people of Jewish descent
Silverman family
20th-century American businesspeople